Experimental Bacteriology: in Its Applications to the Diagnosis, Epidemiology, and Immunology of Infectious Diseases is a textbook on bacteriology and infectious diseases. It was one of the most authoritative works in medical microbiology in the first half of the 20th century.

Aimed at medical students and practitioners, it has been published in ten/eleven editions in German, and in editions in French and English. The first edition appeared in 1906, written by Wilhelm Kolle and Heinrich Hetsch, and the book is frequently referred to as "Kolle-Hetsch." The eighth (1938) and ninth (1942) editions were edited by Hetsch and Hans Schlossberger. The last, significantly revised and largely newly written edition, numbered as a combined tenth and eleventh edition, was published in 1952 by Urban & Schwarzenberg (now Elsevier) with Hans Schlossberger as general editor, and with contributions from H. Brandis, B. Schmidt, H.G. Haussmann, I. Weimershaus-Eckart, A. Kutzsche and W. Weimershaus. Although Schlossberger was general editor, much of the editing work was done by Brandis.
 
A French translation appeared in 1910, published by Doin, and an English edition was published in 1934 by Allen & Unwin.

Bibliography
 Wilhelm Kolle, Heinrich Hetsch, Die experimentelle Bakteriologie und die Infektionskrankheiten mit besonderer Berücksichtigung der Immunitätslehre. Ein Lehrbuch für Studierende, Ärzte und Medizinalbeamte, Urban & Schwarzenberg, 1906
 Hans Schlossberger (general editor), Experimentelle Bakteriologie und Infektionskrankheiten; mit besonderer Berücksichtigung der Immunitätslehre, 10th/11th significantly revised edition,  Urban & Schwarzenberg, 1952
 Wilhelm Kolle, Heinrich Hetsch, La bactériologie expérimentale: appliquée à l'étude des maladies infectieuses, translated by H. Carrière, Paris, Doin, 1910
 Wilhelm Kolle, Heinrich Hetsch, Dagny Erikson, John William Henry Eyre, Experimental Bacteriology in Its Applications to the Diagnosis, Epidemiology, and Immunology of Infectious Diseases, London, Allen & Unwin, 1934

References

Medical manuals
1906 non-fiction books
1906 in biology
Bacteriology
Infectious diseases